The Finding of Moses is a n oil-on-canvas painting by Paolo Veronese, executed ca. 1580 and now in the Museo del Prado in Madrid It is one of at least eight variants of the subject of the finding of Moses by him and his studio.

References

1570s paintings
1580s paintings
Paintings by Paolo Veronese
Veronese, Madrid
Paintings of the Museo del Prado by Italian artists